The  Gent hyperelastic material model  is a phenomenological model of rubber elasticity that is based on the concept of limiting chain extensibility.  In this model, the strain energy density function is designed such that it has a singularity when the first invariant of the left Cauchy-Green deformation tensor reaches a limiting value .

The strain energy density function for the Gent model is 

In the limit where , the Gent model reduces to the Neo-Hookean solid model.  This can be seen by expressing the Gent model in the form

which is the expression for the strain energy density of a Neo-Hookean solid.

Several compressible versions of the Gent model have been designed.  One such model has the form (the below strain energy function yields a non zero hydrostatic stress at no deformation, refer https://link.springer.com/article/10.1007/s10659-005-4408-x for compressible Gent models).

Consistency condition 
We may alternatively express the Gent model in the form

For the model to be consistent with linear elasticity, the following condition has to be satisfied:

where  is the shear modulus of the material.

Therefore, the consistency condition for the Gent model is

The Gent model assumes that

Stress-deformation relations 
The Cauchy stress for the incompressible Gent model is given by

Uniaxial extension 

From incompressibility . Hence . 
Therefore,

The left Cauchy-Green deformation tensor can then be expressed as

If the directions of the principal stretches are oriented with the coordinate basis vectors, we have

If , we have

Therefore,

The engineering stress is

Equibiaxial extension 
From incompressibility . Hence .  
Therefore,

The left Cauchy-Green deformation tensor can then be expressed as

If the directions of the principal stretches are oriented with the coordinate basis vectors, we have

The engineering stress is

Planar extension 
Planar extension tests are carried out on thin specimens which are constrained from deforming in one direction. From incompressibility . Hence .  
Therefore,

The left Cauchy-Green deformation tensor can then be expressed as

If the directions of the principal stretches are oriented with the coordinate basis vectors, we have

The engineering stress is

Simple shear 
The deformation gradient for a simple shear deformation has the form

where  are reference orthonormal basis vectors in the plane of deformation and the shear deformation is given by

In matrix form, the deformation gradient and the left Cauchy-Green deformation tensor may then be expressed as
 
Therefore, 

and the Cauchy stress is given by

In matrix form,

References

See also 
 Hyperelastic material
 Strain energy density function
 Mooney-Rivlin solid
 Finite strain theory
 Stress measures

Continuum mechanics
Elasticity (physics)
Non-Newtonian fluids
Rubber properties
Solid mechanics